Michael Romkey is an American horror writer known primarily for vampire novels. His first book, Fears Point, was released in 1989.

Novels 

Fears Point (1989)
I, Vampire (1990)
The Vampire Papers (1994)
The Vampire Princess (1995)
The Vampire Virus (1997)
Vampire Hunter (1998)
The London Vampire Panic (2001)
The Vampire's Violin (2003)
American Gothic (2004)
Telluride Blood (2016)

External links
Fantastic Fiction

Living people
American horror writers
Year of birth missing (living people)